Keek was a free online social networking service that allowed its users to upload video status updates, which were called "keeks". Users could post keeks to the Keek website using a webcam or via the Keek mobile apps for iPhone, Windows Phone, BlackBerry, or Android. Users could also reply back with text or video comments, known as "keekbacks", and share content to other major social media networks. There was also an embed option so users could embed their keeks into a blog or website.

Origins
The word "Keek" comes from Scots and means a look, especially a quick one. Keek Inc. is based in Toronto, Ontario, Canada, and has around 45 employees. Keek launched in early 2011 to "create a social network that was more authentic and personal. We are committed to delivering the fastest, most engaging social video experience," CEO Isaac Raichyk said in an interview.

Reception
Keek has been described as "the Twitter for video", "Instagram of video" and a "micro version of YouTube". and is often compared to a combination of other major social media networks such as Facebook, YouTube, Tumblr and Twitter. "Keek is more like a combination of YouTube, Facebook and Twitter than its direct competitors."

"What makes Keek different is that it focuses on short, personal video uploads. A 'keek' can only be 36 seconds long, and is usually uploaded directly from a webcam or smartphone camera. So unlike many of the professional vloggers floating around on YouTube, the content is less polished – but also far quicker and reactive. Think of it like Twitter or Tumblr, only this time focused solely on video."

Keek has been described as a "new wave in social media technology" in reaction to the growth it received in 2012.

Growth
In 2012 the Keek community started generating a large amount of original content posting 66,000 videos per day. With the launch of the Keek mobile apps for iOS and Android in March 2012, there was a significant increase in the community and creation of content. Keek added 2 Million users in October 2012 and served 250 million pageviews.

By January 2013 Keek was adding 200,000 users per day to its social network and users were generating 4 million videos per month.

In March 2013, Keek announced the launch of verified accounts. Individuals or businesses can qualify for account verification if they are at high risk of impersonation or if they have large audiences on Keek or other social networks.

Also in March, Keek launched a BlackBerry version of their app allowing BlackBerry 10 users the ability to share videos on Keek, Facebook, Twitter, Tumblr, Email or via SMS.

Between March 2013 and June 2013 Keek added 24 million users to bring its network to a total of 45 million registered users.

On May 17, 2013 Keek added a new private messaging feature, allowing users to privately chat using video or text with up to 36 people at once.

Keek launched a developer portal with API access on June 14, 2013. The new API program will allow developers to access public keeks, search functionality, user profiles, Klusters and more.

Keek launched a Windows phone version of their app on June 27, 2013.

In August 2013 Keek reached a total of 58 million users growing at the rate of 250,000 new users a day. Keek has been the top video app in 18 countries globally.

However, by October 2013 Keek was struggling to raise more venture capital funding through investment firm Morgan Stanley and was forced to downsize its operation to half a dozen staff members.

By November 2013 a reverse takeover bid was announced by oil company Primary Petroleum. The reverse takeover would see Primary Petroleum sell off all of its oil holdings and change its name to Keek Inc, effectively merging the two companies, and bringing Keek to the public stock market. During this time co-founder and CEO Isaac Raichyk left Keek to found a new mobile dating platform called Clover of which he is now CEO.

As of June 2014 Keek was set to expand its offices into New York City, and had changed its upper management to include Jamie King as CPO, Lin Dai as CMO, and Alexandra Cameron as the new CEO.

On October 31, 2016, Keek was rebranded as Peeks Video.

Apps

iOS
The current version of the Keek iOS app is compatible with iPhone, iPad, and iPod Touch running iOS 6.0 or later. The app is free to download in the App Store and can be found in the Social Networking category. The current app, version 4.4, has a rating of 3 out of 5 stars based on 15 user ratings. In total the Keek iOS app has received an overall rating of 4 stars out of 5 based on 14,644 user ratings. The app was last updated to version 4.4 on November 13, 2014.

Windows Phone
The Keek Windows Phone app is compatible with Windows Phone 8 smartphones. The app is free to download from the Windows Phone Store, listed in the Social category. The app was released on June 27, 2013 with version 1.0.0.1. and currently has a rating of 4 1/2 out of 5 stars based on 1,391 reviews. The app is free to download and supports English and Arabic languages.

BlackBerry
The Keek BlackBerry app is compatible with BlackBerry 10 smartphones such as the BlackBerry Z10. The app is free to download from the BlackBerry World store, listed in the Social Networking category. It is currently an Android port and not a native BlackBerry app. The app was released on March 1, 2013 with version 1.0. Currently, version 2.8.4 has a rating of 2 1/2 out of 5 stars. The app is free to download and is rated T for teen. The launch of the app for BlackBerry 10 devices marked the first time Keek was available for any BlackBerry device.

Android
The Keek Android app is compatible with Android devices running Android 2.3 or newer and can be downloaded from the Google Play store. It is currently rated 4.0 out of 5 stars (based on 117,691 user ratings) and has between 5,000,000 - 10,000,000 installs. The app is free to download.

Funding
Funding was originally provided by family and friends of the founder and CEO Isaac Raichyk.

The first round of venture capital funding was led by three Canadian venture capital firms AlphaNorth Asset Management, Plazacorp Ventures and PowerOne Capital Markets Ltd. for $5.5 million (US) on October 5, 2011.

The second round of venture capital funding was led by Cranson Capital Securities with participation from Pinetree Capital Ltd. and Whitecap Venture Partners. This round of financing raised $7 million (US) bringing the total investment financing to more than $12 million (US) as of September 18, 2012.

The third round of venture capital funding was led by AGF Investments Inc., Pinetree Capital Ltd. and Plazacorp Ventures, with Cranson Capital also participating. This round of financing raised $18 Million dollars (US) on January 17, 2013 which brings the total investment financing to $30 million (US).

In the fourth round of funding Keek hired Morgan Stanley to raise more venture capital, however, they were unable to do so and Keek was forced to downsize its operations.

An oil company, Primary Petroleum, set up a bid for a reverse take over of Keek which would bring Keek to the public stock market.

Keek launched on the Toronto Stock Exchange at 0.10 cents a share, and as of July 2014 it was trading at 0.165 cents a share.

Trademark
Keek Inc. filed for a U.S. federal trademark on February 9, 2011 for the term "KEEK" and was designated the trademark serial number 85237909. The trademark was filed in the category "Computer & Software Products & Electrical & Scientific Products , Computer & Software Services & Scientific Services , Advertising, Business & Retail Services , Communications Services , Education and Entertainment Services". Keek Inc. received the registered trademark for "KEEK" on July 3, 2012.

Demographics
As of July, 2012, 85% of the Keek community were between the ages of 13 and 25, with 69% female engagement, and two-thirds of those users were active during that month.

See also
 Instagram
 Mobli
 Snapchat
 Socialcam
 Tout
 Vine

References

External links
 

2011 establishments in Ontario
Android (operating system) software
Companies based in Toronto
Internet properties established in 2011
IOS software
Mobile social software
Online companies of Canada
Defunct social networking services